Shubhdeep Singh Sidhu (11 June 1993 – 29 May 2022), known professionally as Sidhu Moose Wala, was an Indian rapper, singer and songwriter. He works predominantly in Punjabi Music & cinema. Sidhu rose to the mainstream with his track "So High". In 2018, he released his debut album PBX 1, which peaked at number 66 on the Billboard Canadian Albums chart. His single "47" was ranked on the UK Singles Chart. In 2020, Moose Wala was named by The Guardian among 50 up and coming artists. He is generally regarded to have been one of the greatest Punjabi artists of his generation. Moreover, he was considered as a key figure in opening the door for Punjabi artists into mainstream music.

Born in Moosa, Mansa district, Moose Wala started in 2016 as a songwriter for the song "License" by Ninja, and as lead artist in 2017 with Gurlez Akhtar for a duet song, "G Wagon". Following his debut, he collaborated with Brown Boyz for various tracks. His tracks peaked on the UK Asian Music chart. His song "Bambiha Bole" was among the top five on the Global YouTube music chart. In 2021, he released Moosetape, tracks from which charted globally including Billboard Global 200, Billboard Global Excl. US, Canadian Hot 100, UK Asian, and New Zealand Hot charts. He has the most number-one singles on the Billboard India Songs chart.

In 2021, he joined the Indian National Congress political party and unsuccessfully contested the 2022 Punjab Legislative Assembly election from Mansa.

Moose Wala was shot dead by unidentified assailants on 29 May 2022; a Canada-based gangster, active in Punjab, claimed responsibility for the killing, which the police said was a culmination of inter-gang rivalry. On 23 June 2022, his first posthumous single, "SYL", was released.

Moose Wala's lyrics and themes were often seen as controversial in India, and he was accused of promoting gun culture and of challenging religious establishments—as was the case related to Mai Bhago, a revered figure in Sikhism. He had faced legal challenges for his support of gun culture and his inflammatory lyrics.

Early life 
Shubhdeep Singh Sidhu hailed from the village of Moosa in Mansa district of Punjab, India. He was born in a Jat Sikh family, to father Balkaur Singh and mother Charan Kaur. He studied at Guru Nanak Dev Engineering College, Ludhiana and graduated in electrical engineering in 2016. Moose Wala admired and was influenced by rapper Tupac Shakur. He started listening to hip-hop music as a student in sixth grade, and trained in music from Harvinder Bittu in Ludhiana. According to statements he made while campaigning, he chose "Sidhu Moose Wala" (meaning: 'Sidhu from Moosa' or 'Moose’s Sidhu') for his stage name as a tribute to his home village of Moosa.

After graduation, Moose Wala moved to Brampton, Ontario, Canada, as an international student. While living there he studied at Humber College.

Career

Rise to fame 
Moose Wala released his first song "G Wagon" while living in Brampton. He started to perform live shows in India from 2018. He performed numorous shows in Canada. Moose Wala had his breakthrough with the song "So High" in 2017, a gangster rap with music producer Byg Byrd. The song won him the 2017 Best Lyricist award at the Brit Asia TV Music Awards. Following which Sidhu joined 'Brown Boys' along with Sunny Malton & Byg Byrd. He continued his success with singles like "Issa Jatt", "It's All About You", "Just Listen",  and "Warning Shots".

In May 2018, Moose Wala released the single "Tochan". The song was followed by "Famous", which entered Top 40 Uk Asian Charts.

At the 2018 PTC Punjabi Music Awards he was nominated for the Best New Age Sensation award for "Issa Jatt". In August 2018, he launched his first film soundtrack song, "Dollar", for the film Dakuaan Da Munda. In October 2018, Moose Wala released his debut album PBX 1 in the pop music genre with a touch of hip-hop. The album charted on the Canadian Albums Chart. It won him the Best Album Award at the 2019 Brit Asia TV Music Awards.

Continued success in 2019 
In Feb. 2019, Moose Wala released "Legend", under his own record label. It won him the Britasia TV Kuflink Best Track of the Year Award in 2019. In the same month. he released "Chosen" and "Outlaw". In April 2019, Moose Wala released "East Side Flow", which was followed by "Mafia Style".

In June 2019, his concert at the Surrey Music Festival was canceled due to violent activities that had happened in his past performances. In the same month, he released "Poison", featuring R Nait. In July 2019, Moose Wala released "Sohne Lagde", featuring The PropheC. In the same month, he released his film soundtrack title "Hathyar", for Sikander 2.

In August 2019, Moose Wala collaborated with Bohemia for "Same Beef".

In September 2019, he released two film soundtrack songs: "Dogar" for Teri Meri Jodi and "Jatti Jeone Morh Wargi", featuring Sonam Bajwa, for Ardab Mutiyaran.

In October 2019, he released "B Town". He also released  "47", featuring Mist and Stefflon Don, which entered the top 20 on UK Singles Chart. The song also charted on the New Zealand Hot 40 singles chart.

In December 2019, Moose Wala concluded the year with the single "Dhakka". In 2019, Spotify included him in the list of the most popular artists in Punjab, along with Maninder Buttar and Karan Aujla.

2020–2022 
In January 2020, he along with Nseeb featured on Prem Dhillon’s track "Old Skool". The song was followed by "Tibeyan Da Putt", which topped the iTunes charts and was ranked at number 8 on the Apple Music charts in India. His second studio album, Snitches Get Stitches, was released in May 2020, and that same month, he released the single "Dear Mama" on the occasion of his mother's birthday. In June 2020, he collaborated with Amrit Maan on the song "Bambiha Bole". Its music video was viewed over ten million times within twenty-four hours. The song topped in India and entered the top 50 in Canada and New Zealand on the Apple Music chart. It topped the UK Asian charts, and also entered the top 5 of the Global YouTube charts. In September 2020, Moose Wala released "Game" with Shooter Kahlon, which became his first song to chart on the Canadian Hot 100 by Billboard.

In May 2021, Moose Wala released his third studio album, Moosetape. The album charted on New Zealand Albums Chart by Recorded Music NZ. Singles from the album charted on various international charts including Billboard Global 200, Canada Hot 100, and New Zealand Hot Singles chart. On 12 September 2021, he performed at the Wireless Festival in London with British rapper Mist. Moose Wala was the first Indian singer to perform at this festival.

In April 2022, Moose Wala released the EP No Name featuring AR Paisley, Mr. Capone-E and Sunny Malton, which debuted at No. 73 on Billboard Top Canadian Albums. His songs "The Last Ride", "Levels", "Never Fold", and "295" entered the Billboard Canadian Hot 100 chart. "The Last Ride" peaked at No. 26 and "Levels" on 32, and "Never Fold" on 97th rank. Three of his songs also featured on Billboard Global Excl. US chart, "The Last Ride" peaked at 103, "295" peaked at 73, and "Levels" peaked at 195.

In June 2022, his single "SYL" (based on Satluj Yamuna link canal) posthumously peaked at 27 on Canadian Hot 100, 81 in Australia, 3 in India, and 200 on Global Excl. US chart.

Music production
Following the various successful songs with Humble Music, Moose Wala started releasing songs independently in 2018. He released the first song "Warning Shots", which was a diss track targetting Karan Aujla's track "Lafaafe". In the same year, his debut album, PBX 1, was released under T-Series, followed by the release of most of his tracks under his own label, as well as tracks from other artists. In 2020, Moose Wala released his second studio album, Snitches Get Stitches, under his own label. On 31 August 2020, Moose Wala officially launched his record label, 5911 Records.

Acting
Moose Wala made his debut in Punjabi cinema in the film Yes I Am Student under his own production company Jatt Life Studios. The film was directed by Tarnvir Singh Jagpal and written by Gill Raunta. In 2019, Moose Wala appeared in Teri Meri Jodi. In June 2020, he announced another film titled Gunah. On 22 August 2021, he released the teaser of his upcoming movie, Moosa Jatt, starring Sweetaj Brar and directed by Tru Makers. On 24 August 2021, he announced his new film Jattan Da Munda Gaun Lagya, directed by Amberdeep Singh, which was set for release on 18 March 2022.

Personal life 
Moose Wala had a lot of attachment to his village Moosa, so he used to stay in his village. When he was alive, his fans used to visit his village everyday to meet him. He was very attached to his grandmother. He kept his hair at the behest of his grandmother, which was very important in Sikhism, because his father could not keep his hair due to an accident.

According to artists like Afsana Khan, Gippy Grewal, Amrit Maan, Moose Wala's personality was totally different from his songs. In real life he was a down to earth person.

Feuds
Moose Wala had a rivalry with Karan Aujla; both have replied to each other through songs, social media handles, and live performances. Also, both have been criticised for songs promoting violence. Elly Mangat, both Moose Wala's and Aujla's then-colleague, in an interview disclosed that the dispute between both began when Sidhu's video targeting Aujla in his song was leaked to Aujla's management, and they threatened to attack Sidhu. Following the incident, both started targeting each other on social media. The rivalry was resolved temporarily until Aujla released a diss-track, "Lafaafe", followed by Sidhu's "Warning Shot". Aujla in an interview stated that he did not write the track "Lafaafe" and did not reveal anything about their rivalry, but praised Moose Wala's work.  After Moose Wala's death, Aujla paid tribute with the song "Maa".

Legal issues and controversies 
At the time of his death, Moose Wala was facing criminal charges for promoting gun culture and violence. Two of the charges were related to obscene scenes.

In May 2020, two videos featuring Moose Wala went viral on social media: one showcased him training to use an AK-47 with assistance from police officers, and the other saw him use a personal pistol. The six officers who had assisted him were suspended following the incident. On 19 May, he was booked under two sections of the Arms Act. The police began conducting raids to find Moose Wala, but he absconded to evade arrest. On 2 June, the Barnala District Court rejected a plea for anticipatory bail for Moose Wala and five accused officers.

On 6 June 2020, he was fined by police in Nabha because his car windows were tinted black beyond what was permissible and was allowed to leave despite being under lookout; Moose Wala incorrectly told the officers that he was already on bail. In July, he joined the police investigation and was granted regular bail. That month, he released a single titled "Sanju", comparing himself to actor Sanjay Dutt, who was also arrested under the Arms Act. Indian sport shooter Avneet Sidhu criticised the song and called out Moose Wala for promoting gun culture. The next day, a case was registered against him for releasing the song. In an interview, Moose Wala alleged that he was being deliberately targeted by some news channels and lawyers.

References to Mai Bhago 
In September 2019, his song "Jatti Jeone Morh Wargi" was deemed inappropriate by Sikh leaders for using the name of Mai Bhago, a 17th-century Sikh warrior woman. Sikh delegations and Akali Dal leaders demanded a ban on the song, subsequently lodging complaints against Moose Wala in Mansa and Bathinda. Moose Wala later apologised on social media and in March 2020 appeared before the Sikh religious body Akal Takht in a hearing over the incident.

References to Khalistan movement 
In December 2020, Moose Wala released the single "Panjab: My Motherland" in support of the Indian farmers protest against the 2020 Indian agriculture acts, which featured clips of an orthodox militant Jarnail Singh Bhindranwale and speeches made by a supporter of Khalistan (in political sense), Bharpur Singh Balbir, in the late 1980s. In an interview Moose Wala said that Khalistan (in sacred sense) means a pure place (पवित्र-स्थान), like it was under the rule of Maharaja Ranjit Singh, where people of all religions lived in harmony.

Politics 
Moose Wala actively campaigned for his mother, Charan Kaur, who won the sarpanch election from Moosa village in December 2018.

On 3 December 2021, Moose Wala joined the Indian National Congress to contest the 2022 Punjab Legislative Assembly election. Nazar Singh Manshahia, the Congress MLA from Mansa, revolted and opposed Moose Wala's candidacy. Obtaining only 20.52% votes from the Mansa constituency, Moose Wala lost to Aam Aadmi Party's Vijay Singla by a margin of 63,323 votes.

During the 2022 election, a case under Section 188 of the Indian Penal Code was filed against Moose Wala for his violation of the election code of conduct. He had held a door-to-door campaign in the Mansa constituency after the end of the allowed duration of the election campaign.

On 11 April 2022, Moose Wala released a song titled "Scapegoat", in which he laments his failure in the 2022 Punjab state assembly elections. The Aam Aadmi Party (AAP) claimed that Moose Wala through his song insinuated that the voters of Punjab were "gaddar" for electing the AAP. They also claimed that Moose Wala's song perpetuates the Indian National Congress' "anti-Punjab" mentality and demanded an answer from the party's state unit president, Amrinder Singh Raja Warring, on whether he endorsed Moose Wala's views.

Electoral performance

Death 

Moose Wala was shot dead by unidentified assailants in his car on 29 May 2022 in Jawaharke village of Mansa district. According to police, the Lawrence Bishnoi gang initially claimed responsibility for the murder in an unverified Facebook post, which Bishnoi denied making, but is being held by the Punjab Police as of June 2022 and is considered the "mastermind" by officials in the murder.

According to police, at around 4:30 pm, Sidhu Moose Wala left his house with his cousin Gurpreet Singh and neighbor Gurwinder Singh. Moose Wala was driving his black Mahindra Thar SUV. He was going to his aunt's house in Barnala. At 5:30 when the SUV reached the village Jawaharke, two other cars intercepted and blocked it. Thirty rounds were fired during the incident, which also injured two other men. Moose Wala also fired back at the attackers using his pistol. After the shootout, the attackers left the scene. His father took Moose Wala to the civil hospital in Mansa, where he was declared dead.

Moose Wala was among the 424 people whose police security was reduced or entirely removed the day before, in preparation for the anniversary of Operation Blue Star, leaving him with two commandos only, as compared to four earlier. At the time of the incident, Moose Wala was travelling in his private car accompanied by two others instead of his bullet-proof vehicle with the police commandos. According to his friends, Moose Wala did not take his security along with him, as his Thar SUV that he chose to drive could not accommodate five people.

Aftermath 
According to the police, the Lawrence Bishnoi gang has claimed to kill Moose Wala to avenge the murder of an Akali leader, Vicky Middukhera, in 2021. Moose Wala's aide was purported by the Bishnoi gang of having a role in the killing of Middukhera, though there is no legal evidence to support this. A Canadian gangster of Punjabi origin, identified as Satinder Singh alias Goldy Brar, claimed responsibility for the murder. Brar, a close associate of a gangster Lawrence Bishnoi, claimed that his "Punjab Module" (gang) carried out the shooting. Both Brar and Bishnoi have criminal cases against them in India. The Punjab police later confirmed Bishnoi's involvement.

Subsequently, in the FIR, Moose Wala's father revealed that Moose Wala was receiving death threats from gangsters for extortion purposes, a statement corroborated by singer Mika Singh.

Punjab Chief Minister Bhagwant Mann condemned the murder. Calling Moose Wala "a cultural icon of Punjab", he expressed shock and grief on his death and condoled the aggrieved family. Mann ordered an investigation into why Moose Wala's security was reduced by the Punjab police two days prior. He also announced the setting up of a judicial commission headed by a sitting judge of the Punjab and Haryana High Court to investigate the killing. Numerous celebrities offered their condolences on social media.

Police found bullets from an AN-94 Russian assault rifle and a pistol at the spot of the killing. Police have detained six suspects in the incident from the state of Uttarakhand. On 30 May, one of the murder suspects was detained by the Punjab Police while he was hiding among the pilgrims of Gurudwara Shri Hemkund Sahib.

On 30 May, the Delhi unit of Indian National Congress staged a protest near Aam Aadmi Party supremo Arvind Kejriwal's residence holding the AAP-ruled Government of Punjab responsible for the incident, blaming the state government's decision to curtail Moose Wala's security cover.

His autopsy was carried out by five doctors, and the event was videographed. According to post-mortem reports, Moose Wala's body received 19 bullet injuries, and he died in 15 minutes after getting shot due to gunshot wounds.

Moose Wala was cremated in his ancestral village on 31 May. His last rites were performed on his farmland.

On 3 June, Lawrence Bishnoi allegedly admitted to being involved in the murder and that he had a rivalry with Moose Wala.

On 8 June, a bhog ceremony was arranged in Mansa.

On 3 July, Ankit Sirsa was arrested by Delhi police for being one of the shooters involved in the killing.

On 20 July, gangsters Manpreet Mannu and Jagrup Rupa, suspected to be involved in Moose Wala's killing were gunned down by the Punjab Police.

On 26 July, India TV reported that Punjab Police arrested the last absconding shooter, Deepak Mundi. However, The Indian Express reported that he was arrested on 11 September near the Bengal-Nepal border.

Politics

Before the Sangrur Lok Sabha by-polls in 2022, the Indian National Congress party had used pictures of Moose Wala in its election song. The family of Moose Wala made a public appeal to political parties and individuals, asking them to not use his name for political or personal motives. Tribune newspaper reported that this appeal came as a setback for the Congress party as it was intended to use the public sympathy over Moose Wala's death for electoral benefit in the by-polls.

Legacy and remembrance 
Bhagwant Mann on 3 June announced a cancer hospital and sports stadium in remembrance of Sidhu Moose Wala.

On 8 June, the city of Brampton in Canada passed a motion in the city council to commission a giant mural which will be painted by a local artist and to plant a tree in the singer's honor.

Punjabi language singer Prem Dhillon released a tribute song, "Ain't Died In Vain", dedicated to Moose Wala on 16 June. Posthumously, on his 29th birthday, Moose Wala received a tribute from his fans when the billboards of New York City's Times Square were hired to play his songs.

Garry Sandhu released a tribute song "Jigar Da Tota", dedicated to Sidhu 

On 5 June, two murals in California, USA were made in tribute of Sidhu Moosewala. Rapper Bohemia also visited it and broke down in tears after an emotional tribute.

On 17 June, Canadian rapper Drake played two of Moose Wala's singles "295" & "G-Shit" from Moosetape in remembrance on his debut radio show called Table for One on Sound42.

On 25 July, Pak literary society honored Moose Wala with Waris Shah International Award.

On November 2022, Nigerian artist Burna Boy met with Moosewala's parents for their blessings and offered his condolences. Burna and Steel Banglez (music producer) honoured them with portrait of their son made from crystals. Burna has also paid tribute to Sidhu previously, where he broke down on stage giving a tribute to the late singer. 

Sunny Malton who was formerly with Sidhu in the Punjabi group, Brown Boys, released a tribute song "Letter to Sidhu" in November 2022.

Singer Drake launched a t-shirt collection to honour Moose Wala, wearing one himself at a concert in Canada on 28 July.

Discography 

Studio albums
 PBX 1 (2018)
 Snitches Get Stitches (2020)
 Moosetape (2021)

Extended play
 No Name (2022)

Filmography

Actor

Tours 
 Brown Boys Tour/ PBX 1 Tour (2018–19)
 Solo New Zealand/Italy/India Live Shows (2019–20)
 Back To Business World Tour with Sunny Malton (2022–23)

See also 
List of murdered hip hop musicians

Notes

References

External links 

 
 
 

1993 births
2022 deaths
2022 murders in India
21st-century Indian male actors
21st-century Indian male singers
21st-century Indian singers
21st-century Indian male writers
21st-century Indian politicians
Assassinated Indian politicians
Deaths by firearm in India
Punjabi rappers
Desi musicians
Former members of Indian National Congress from Punjab
Indian actor-politicians
Indian emigrants to Canada
Indian hip hop musicians
Indian lyricists
Indian male singer-songwriters
Indian rappers
Indian Sikhs
People from Mansa district, India
People murdered in Punjab, India
Punjabi-language lyricists
Punjabi-language singers
Singers from Punjab, India